Casuarina is a town located in north-eastern New South Wales, Australia, in the Tweed Shire.

Demographics
In the 2016 Census Casuarina recorded a population of 2,678 people, 50.2% female and 49.8% male.

The median age of the Casuarina population was 35 years, 2 years below the national median of 37.

80.7% of people living in Casuarina were born in Australia. The other top responses for country of birth were England 4.2%, New Zealand 3.9%, United States of America 1.2%, South Africa 0.9%, Scotland 0.7%.

92.4% of people spoke only English at home; the next most common languages were 0.5% Italian, 0.2% German, 0.2% Portuguese, 0.2% Balinese, 0.2% Maltese.

Houses in the area typically do not have backyards.

References 

Suburbs of Tweed Heads, New South Wales
Coastal towns in New South Wales